Wendy Raquel Flores Cano (born 24 March 1994) is a Nicaraguan footballer who plays as a midfielder for the Nicaragua women's national team.

Club career
Flores has played for UNAN Managua in Nicaragua.

International career
Flores capped for Nicaragua at senior level during the 2010 Central American and Caribbean Games and the 2012 CONCACAF Women's Olympic Qualifying Tournament qualification.

References 

1994 births
Living people
Nicaraguan women's footballers
Women's association football midfielders
Nicaragua women's international footballers